Radwell is a village and civil parish in Hertfordshire, England. It is situated close to the A1 a little to the north of Baldock and Letchworth Garden City and is in the district of North Hertfordshire.

The small 14th century Church of All Saints is in the centre of the village. The actor Nigel Hawthorne and his long-time partner Trevor Bentham lived in the village for some years until the nearby Baldock Services was built. Fearing the noise levels from the service station would become unacceptable the couple moved to Thundridge in Hertfordshire.

References

External links

Radwell on A Guide to Old Hertfordshire

Villages in Hertfordshire
Civil parishes in Hertfordshire